Kingsoft Corporation is a Chinese software company based in Beijing.  Kingsoft operates four subsidiaries: Seasun for video game development, Cheetah Mobile for mobile internet apps, Kingsoft Cloud for cloud storage platforms, and WPS for office software, including WPS Office. It also produced security software known as Kingsoft Security. The most popular game developed by Kingsoft is JX Online 3, launched in 2009.

Kingsoft owns data centers in mainland China, Hong Kong, Russia, Southeast Asia, and North America.

The company was founded in 1988 by Qiu Bojun. It reached its prime during 2008–2010. In 2011, Bojun sold his 15.68% stake in Kingsoft to Tencent.

Kingsoft is listed on the Hong Kong Stock Exchange.

References

External links
  

Chinese brands
Chinese companies established in 1988
Software companies established in 1988
Software companies based in Beijing
Companies listed on the Hong Kong Stock Exchange
Multinational companies headquartered in China
Privately held companies of China
Antivirus software